Hulburd is a surname. Notable people with the surname include:

Benjamin N. Hulburd (1898–1964), American attorney, politician, and judge
Calvin T. Hulburd (1809–1897), American politician
Hiland R. Hulburd (1829–1880), American government official
Jon Hulburd (born 1956), American lawyer and businessman
Roger W. Hulburd (1856–1944), American lawyer and politician